Auto Assembly, was first in development from 1994 under the names BotCon UK and la-Con. It was officially founded in 2000 as "The Auto-Assembly." Auto Assembly was a Transformers convention held in Birmingham, UK and run by the science fiction fan organisation Infinite Frontiers. The first event was held in October 2000 and was held annually (except in 2002 and 2007 when it took "gap years") until the final event in 2015. The event was originally called "The Auto-Assembly," and came to be referred to colloquially as "AA."

Sven Harvey stepped down from his role with the event between the 2008 and 2009 conventions due to various issues unrelated to the event but has now returned to the team. Head of Infinite Frontiers Simon Plumbe is now the owner of the convention, working with a team of volunteers.

The convention started life as a small-scale event, intended to be an occasional Transformers-themed equivalent of the meetings held by the Star Trek fan club Alpha Quadrant (which itself grew from the Delta Quadrant '96 convention run by Infinite Frontiers.) The first event was expected to have a relatively small number of fans attending — smaller than the Star Trek meetings — although this figure was exceeded. Sven's original idea was to grow the meetings over time and then launch the Ia-con convention as an annual event based on the meetings, which originally were to be quarterly. "The Auto-Assembly" ran on October 22nd, 2000 and was run by Sven with Simon in a support administrative role. From the first meeting, however, the event grew rapidly and by 2003 "The Auto-Assembly" name was so strong a brand that calling it Ia-con would have been a confusing move. Auto Assembly 2003, only the third event, had expanded to a full-scale convention, though at that point it was referred to as a Transformers Collectors Fair. The growth of the event and the friendliness of the fans in attendance actually converted Simon into a Transformers fan in the process.

The convention attracts fans from all over the UK, Europe, and as far afield as America and Australia and currently holds the European attendance record with 1064 fans attending Auto Assembly 2015 from the UK and Europe.

The convention has a range of activities, including dealers tables, guest talks, autograph sessions, toy and art displays, video screenings, competitions, charity auctions, workshops (added for 2009) and more. Auto Assembly 2009 featured the convention's first live band as part of its programme — former boy band turned rock band, Next of Kin. In association with sponsors every year, the convention also gives all of its attendees a "goodie bag" filled with complimentary gifts, which have included a range of items, including postcards, comics, magazines, stickers, PlayStation 2 games, posters, and snacks.

Regular guests at the convention have included Transformers comic writer Simon Furman, artists Andrew Wildman, Lee Sullivan, Geoff Senior, Simon Williams, and colourist Jason Cardy. Past voice actor guests have included Wally Wingert (Sideburn and Mirage from Transformers: Robots In Disguise) and Neil Kaplan (Optimus Prime and Ro-Tor, Transformers: Robots In Disguise), David Kaye (Megatron from Beast Wars, Beast Machines, Transformers: Armada, Transformers: Energon, Transformers: Cybertron and Optimus Prime in Transformers: Animated), G1 actor Dan Gilvezan in 2008 (Bumblebee) and for 2009 Beast Wars actor Ian James Corlett and G1 actor Gregg Berger.

Auto Assembly: Target 2006, inspired by the Marvel UK comic story of the same name, had the Auto Assembly debut appearances of artists Guido Guidi and Mike Collins, and the first UK appearance by its guest of honour voice actor David Kaye along with its regular comic guests.

In March 2006, the convention expanded its activities further with the launch of the Auto Assembly Podcast which featured the normally expected chat and news updates, but also included interviews, competitions and music. The podcast was hosted by Simon Plumbe and Sven Harvey, who ran the event at the time.

Auto Assembly 2008 was notable by having its first display from Hasbro featuring the unveiling of handmade resin versions of Transformers: Animated Optimus Prime, Megatron and Bulkhead being given away through a prize draw from an online competition. It also saw the world debut of the trailer for the Transformers: Animated game for the Nintendo DS from Activision. The convention also attracted a great deal of media attention and was attended by a television camera crew from Central News who filmed for a news broadcast, a radio broadcaster from BBC Radio WM attended, and a live interview with Sven Harvey for BBC Radio 5 Live took place early in the day.

The first Auto Assembly Europe convention was held in November 2011, was held in Uppsala, Sweden. It was organised as a joint operation between the Auto Assembly organisers and the Nordic TransFans Association.

In March 2015, it was announced that Auto Assembly 2015 would be the final Auto Assembly event due to conflicts with the health and personal lives of the team members at the time. Auto Assembly itself is continuing with other activities including the publication of its fanzine The Cybertronian Times.

The convention has definitely come to an end now with TF Nation taking its place, but the Auto Assembly and Infinite Frontiers website continue, and the founder is running the Autobase Birmingham fan club which is closely linked to the Spacedock Birmingham Star Trek fan club and is maintaining ties with Transmasters UK (TMUK). Ia-con is still in development.

Convention Exclusives
Each year the convention produces a full colour fanzine, The Cybertronian Times, which features articles, artwork, fiction and reviews covering all eras of Transformers. In previous years, this fanzine has featured contributions from Simon Furman, Lee Sullivan and Simon Williams. Additional convention exclusives have been produced, including postcards from 2003 onwards and pin badges for 2005 and 2006.
2003 - The Cybertronian Times Issue 5, Optimus Prime postcard (Lee Sullivan artwork), Megatron postcard (Lee Sullivan artwork)
2004 - The Cybertronian Times Issue 6, Devastator postcard (Andrew Wildman artwork), Sideburn/Mirage postcard (Lee Sullivan artwork), Transformers: The Ultimate Guide (Wildfur / Auto Assembly Bookplated Edition)
2005 - The Cybertronian Times Issue 7, RiD Optimus Prime postcard (Simon Williams artwork), Pin badge (1 of 2)
2006 - The Cybertronian Times Issue 8, Beast Wars Megatron postcard (Simon Williams artwork), Cougar postcard (Guido Guidi artwork), Pin badge (2 of 2), Auto Assembly lanyard
2008 - The Cybertronian Times Issue 9, MiniCT Issue 3, Bumblebee/Spiderman postcard (Simon Williams artwork), TF Animated Jazz postcard (Kat Nicholson artwork), G1 Optimus Prime postcard (Lee Sullivan artwork), Bumblebee/Spiderman keyring (Simon Williams artwork), TF Animated Jazz keyring (Kat Nicholson artwork), G1 Optimus Prime keyring (Lee Sullivan artwork)
2009 - The Cybertronian Times Issue 10, Beast Wars Cheetor postcard (Simon Williams / Kris Carter artwork), G1 Grimlock postcard (Andrew Wildman artwork), Beast Wars Cheetor keyring (Simon Williams artwork), G1 Grimlock keyring (Andrew Wildman artwork), Auto Assembly 2009 lanyard, IDW Publishing All Hail Megatron Issue 13 Auto Assembly 2009 exclusive variant cover (Nick Roche / Liam Shalloo artwork), Auto Assembly 2009 mug (Andrew Wildman/Simon Williams/Jason Cardy/Kat Nicholson/Kris Carter artwork)
2010 - The Cybertronian Times Issue 11, Beast Wars Optimus Primal postcard (Simon Williams / Kris Carter artwork), Beast Wars Optimus Primal keyring (Simon Williams / Kris Carter artwork), IDW Publishing Transformers Issue 9 Auto Assembly 2010 exclusive variant cover (Nick Roche / Liam Shalloo artwork)
2011 - The Cybertronian Times Issue 12, Transformers Animated Optimus Prime postcard (Kat Nicholson artwork), Transformers Animated Optimus Prime keyring (Kat Nicholson artwork), Death's Head Postcard (Simon Williams / Kris Carter artwork), G1 Grimlock postcard (Simon Williams / Liam Shalloo artwork)
2012 - The Cybertronian Times Issue 13, Iacon Independent (convention exclusive comic), Transformers Animated Sentinel Prime postcard (Kat Nicholson artwork), Galvatron postcard (Jeff Anderson artwork), Galvatron lithograph (Jeff Anderson / Kris Carter artwork), Convention guest lithograph (Ed Pirrie / Liam Shalloo artwork)

Convention Dates
Twelve Auto Assembly events have been held to-date, relocating as new venues have been needed to accommodate the growing attendance figures. Attendance figures are listed in brackets after the venue.
2000: 22 October 2000 - Ibis Hotel, Birmingham, England (31)
2001: 4 March 2001 - Ibis Hotel, Birmingham, England (61)
2002: No convention
2003: 2 August 2003 - Britannia Hotel, Birmingham, England (234)
2004: 8–9 May 2004 - Britannia Hotel, Birmingham, England (320)
2005: 4 June 2005 - Clarendon Suites, Birmingham, England (409)
2006: 3 June 2006 - Clarendon Suites, Birmingham, England (400)
2007: No convention
2008: 2 August 2008 - Clarendon Suites, Birmingham, England (423)
2009: 15–16 August 2009 - Holiday Inn Birmingham City Centre, Smallbrook Queensway, Birmingham, England (501)
2010: 13–15 August 2010 - Holiday Inn Birmingham City Centre, Smallbrook Queensway, Birmingham, England (579)
2011: 12–14 August 2011 - Holiday Inn Birmingham City Centre, Smallbrook Queensway, Birmingham, England (577)
2011: 12–13 November 2011 - Clarion Gillet Hotel, Uppsala, Sweden (Auto Assembly Europe)
2012: 3–5 August 2012 - Hilton Birmingham Metropole Hotel, Birmingham, England (773)
2013: 9–11 August 2013 - Hilton Birmingham Metropole Hotel, Birmingham, England (833)
2014: 8–10 August 2014 - Hilton Birmingham Metropole Hotel, Birmingham, England (938)
2015: 21–23 August 2015 - Hilton Birmingham Metropole Hotel, Birmingham, England (1,064)

Convention Guests
The convention has been joined by a number of guests over the years. To date, the following have attended or are scheduled to attend:
Stephen Baskerville - 2011, 2012, 2013
Michael Bell - 2012
Gregg Berger - 2009, 2011,2012 (live via video link-up)
Steve Blum - 2013
John-Paul Bove - 2011, 2012, 2013, 2014, 2015
Lee Bradley - 2008, 2009, 2010, 2011, 2012, 2013, 2014, 2015
Jason Cardy - 2004, 2005, 2006, 2008, 2009, 2010, 2011, 2012, 2013, 2014, 2015
Kris Carter - 2009, 2010, 2011, 2012, 2013, 2014, 2015
Garry Chalk - 2010
Townsend Coleman - 2012, 2014
Mike Collins - 2006, 2009
Ian James Corlett - 2009
Jon Davis-Hunt - 2009
Paul Eiding - 2012
Bill Forster - 2010
Simon Furman - 2003, 2004, 2005, 2006, 2008, 2010, 2011, 2011 (Auto Assembly Europe), 2012, 2013, 2014, 2015
Dan Gilvezan - 2008, 2013
Andrew Griffith - 2013, 2015
Martin Griffiths - 2008
Guido Guidi - 2006
James Horan - 2015
Neil Kaplan - 2005, 2013
David Kaye - 2006, 2011
Jane Lawson - 2003, 2004, 2008
Staz Johnson - 2008, 2009
Michael McConnohie - 2014
John McCrea - 2008
Scott McNeil - 2010
Alex Milne - 2013, 2014, 2015
Sumalee Montano - 2015
Kat Nicholson - 2006, 2008, 2009, 2010, 2011, 2012, 2013, 2014, 2015
Next Of Kin - 2009
Ed Pirrie - 2012, 2013
Livio Ramondelli - 2012, 2014
James Roberts - 2010, 2011, 2012, 2013, 2014, 2015
Nick Roche - 2009, 2010, 2011, 2012, 2013, 2014, 2015
Mark Ryan - 2011 (live via video link-up)
Geoff Senior - 2005, 2008, 2011
Liam Shalloo - 2008, 2009, 2010, 2011, 2012, 2013, 2014, 2015
David Sobolov - 2014
Jim Sorenson - 2010, 2013, 2014, 2015
Peter Spellos - 2014, 2015
Lew Stringer - 2009
Lee Sullivan - 2004, 2005, 2006, 2009
Andrew Wildman - 2003, 2004, 2005, 2006, 2008, 2009, 2011, 2012, 2013, 2014, 2015
Simon Williams - 2004, 2005, 2006, 2008, 2009, 2010, 2011
Wally Wingert - 2004
Derrick J Wyatt - 2010
Kei Zama - 2015

Notes
Lew Stringer was scheduled to attend as the convention's first ever guest in 2001 but was unable to attend at the last minute due to transport difficulties. He was also due to be a guest at the 2008 event, but had to pull out due to work commitments.
Guests of honour are indicated in bold.

The Auto Assembly Forum
The Auto Assembly Forum is run by convention committee head Simon Plumbe, with the help of the moderators. The forum is not as busy as many of the larger Transformers forums, but is still a vibrant fan community. It was founded on 19 August 2003 following Auto Assembly 2003 to act as a support forum for the conventions, but it quickly developed into a thriving community all of its own. The forum was closed in the Summer of 2011 due to dwindling usage and was relaunched in September of the same year on a new server to coincide of the relaunch and redesign of the conventions website.

Sources 
 Attendance figures - Official Auto Assembly attendance figures from 2000-2015 provided to this article by the convention organisers. Revised 31 August 2015.
 Article content expanded by convention organisers (last update by convention head, 31 August 2015)
 All current article contents continually reviewed and monitored by convention committee.

References

External links
Auto Assembly - The official website of Auto Assembly
Auto Assembly Europe - The official website of Auto Assembly Europe
Auto Assembly Forum - The official Auto Assembly forum
TheTransformers.Net - Gallery of Auto Assembly 2003 photos
Transformers At The Moon - Gallery and report from Auto Assembly 2005
Transformers At The Moon - Gallery and report from Auto Assembly 2006
Auto Assembly 2008 Gallery - Featured on Transformers At The Moon
Transformers At The Moon - Gallery from 2009 at Transformers At The Moon
Transformers-Universe.com - Gallery of Auto Assembly: Target 2006 photos
Transformers-Universe.com - Auto Assembly 2008 Pictures and Report
BBC Birmingham - BBC Birmingham report from Auto Assembly 2008
BBC Coverage - BBC Birmingham covered the 2009 event with a feature and gallery on their website

Transformers (franchise)
Defunct multigenre conventions
Recurring events established in 2000
Defunct science fiction conventions
Recurring events disestablished in 2015